Jéssica Albiach Satorres (born 29 May 1979) is a Spanish journalist and politician. A member of Podemos and En Comú Podem, she was elected to the Parliament of Catalonia in 2015, and has led the latter party in that legislature since 2018.

Early life and education
Jéssica Albiach was born in Valencia. She studied Journalism at CEU Cardinal Herrera University. Albiach had a six-month Erasmus stint at KU Leuven in Belgium. Soon after, she studied photography and took a course in Anthropology at the National University of Distance Education, which she did not finish. She moved to Prague to dedicate herself to photography, and on returning, she taught the Catalan language to immigrants for Caritas Internationalis.

Career
In October 2015, shortly after being elected to the Parliament of Catalonia, Albiach was chosen as one of two spokespeople for En Comú Podem ahead of national elections in December.

In September 2018, after the exit of Xavier Domènech, Albiach was elected as En Comú Podem's leader in the Catalan parliament. On 27 February 2020, she received the backing of mayor of Barcelona Ada Colau to lead the party in the 2021 Catalan election.

Political views
Albiach has criticised unilateral measures by the Catalan independence movement, such as the 2017 independence referendum, as being counter-productive for the movement. She proposes a regulated referendum as the solution to the debate.

In June 2020, during the George Floyd protests, Albiach supported the removal of the Monument to Christopher Columbus in Barcelona, saying that "we have nothing to celebrate on 12 October (Spain's national day, based on the date of Columbus's arrival in the Americas)".

In the 2021 regional election campaign, Albiach proposed further devolution of power to Catalonia, including in the sectors of housing, railways, immigration, and dialogue with the European Union.

References

1979 births
Living people
People from Valencia
Politicians from the Valencian Community
Spanish photographers
Spanish journalists
KU Leuven alumni
Podemos (Spanish political party) politicians
Leaders of political parties in Spain
Members of the 11th Parliament of Catalonia
Members of the 12th Parliament of Catalonia
Spanish expatriates in the Czech Republic
Women members of the Parliament of Catalonia